Lodi is a city located in San Joaquin County, California, in the center portion of California's Central Valley. The population was 62,134 at the 2010 census.

Lodi is best known for wine grape production, although its vintages have historically been less prestigious than those of Sonoma and Napa counties. However, in recent years, the Lodi Appellation has become increasingly respected for its Zinfandel and other eclectic wine varietals, along with its focus on sustainability under the Lodi Rules program.  National recognition came from the Creedence Clearwater Revival song "Lodi" and continued with the "2015 Wine Region of the Year" award given to Lodi by Wine Enthusiast Magazine.

History
When a group of local families decided to establish a school in 1859, they settled on a site near present-day Cherokee Lane and Turner Road. Settlers flocked from nearby Woodbridge, Liberty City, and Galt, including town founders John M. Burt and Dan Crist.

Initially called Mokelumne and Mokelumne Station after the nearby river, confusion with other nearby towns prompted a name change, which was officially endorsed in Sacramento by an assembly bill. Several stories have been offered about the origins of the town's name change. One refers to a locally stabled trotting horse that had set a four-mile (6 km) record, but as the horse reached the peak of its fame in 1869, it is unlikely that its notoriety would still have been evident in 1873. Alternatively, Lodi is a city in northern Italy where Napoleon defeated the Austrians in 1796 and won his first military victory. More than likely, some of the earliest settler families were from Lodi, Illinois, and they chose to use the same name as their hometown.

In 1906, the city was officially incorporated by voters, passing by a margin of 2 to 1. The fire department was established in 1911, and the city purchased the Bay City Gas and Water Works in 1919. Additional public buildings constructed during this period include the Lodi Opera House in 1905, a Carnegie library in 1909, and a hospital in 1915.

Lodi gained international attention in 2005 when local residents Hamid and Umer Hayat were arrested and charged in the first terrorism trial in the state of California.  In 2019, a judge recommended his conviction be overturned, citing an ineffective legal defense for Hayat—who was defended by a lawyer that had never previously served in a criminal case in a federal court. The recommendation also cites a coerced confession obtained by the FBI, which one former agent described as the "sorriest confession" he had ever seen.

Demographics

The 2020 United States Census reported that Lodi had a population of 67,586. The racial makeup of Lodi was 62.1% White, 1.8% African American, 0.5% Native American, 9.7% Asian, 0.4% Pacific Islander, and 17.2% from two or more races. Hispanic or Latino of any race were 22,613 persons 37.8%.

There were 22,097 households, out of which 8,462 (38.3%) had children under the age of 18 living in them, 10,952 (49.6%) were opposite-sex married couples living together, 2,917 (13.2%) had a female householder with no husband present, 1,389 (6.3%) had a male householder with no wife present.  There were 1,530 (6.9%) unmarried opposite-sex partnerships, and 105 (0.5%) same-sex married couples or partnerships. 5,547 households (25.1%) were made up of individuals, and 2,567 (11.6%) had someone living alone who was 65 years of age or older. The average household size was 2.78. There were 15,258 families (69.1% of all households); the average family size was 3.35.

The population was spread out, with 17,282 people (27.8%) under the age of 18, 5,863 people (9.4%) aged 18 to 24, 15,931 people (25.6%) aged 25 to 44, 14,681 people (23.6%) aged 45 to 64, and 8,377 people (13.5%) who were 65 years of age or older.  The median age was 34.3 years. For every 100 females, there were 95.5 males.  For every 100 females age 18 and over, there were 92.1 males.

The homeowner vacancy rate was 2.3%; the rental vacancy rate was 8.2%.  32,153 people (51.7% of the population) lived in owner-occupied housing units and 29,304 people (47.2%) lived in rental housing units. The Census reported that 61,457 people (98.9% of the population) lived in households, 187 (0.3%) lived in non-institutionalized group quarters, and 490 (0.8%) were institutionalized.

There were approximately 4,336 adults who hadn't passed ninth grade, 5,175 with some high school education, 8,910 who had completed a high school education only, 8,367 with some college, 2,777 with an associate degree; People with a bachelor's degree numbered 3,797; those with a graduate degree, 1,685. Seventy-nine percent of the population had a high school diploma or higher.

Geography
Historically, land in the area has been used for grazing as well as for grain production.

There has long been a movement in the area to preserve a "greenbelt" as a buffer zone between Lodi and Stockton in order to keep the two cities separate.

Climate
Lodi has cool, wet winters, often characterized by dense ground fog, and hot, dry summers with a considerably higher degree of diurnal temperature variation than in winter. According to the Köppen climate classification system, Lodi has a hot-summer Mediterranean climate (Köppen Csa). Due to the city's proximity to the Sacramento-San Joaquin Delta, summer temperatures usually dip into the fifties at night.  Fog and low overcast sometimes drifts in from San Francisco Bay during the summer and it can be breezy at times, especially at night.

Annual precipitation averages , falling on an average of 59 days. Snow is very rare in Lodi, but  fell on January 12, 1930. January is the wettest month.

Economy

Early industries in Lodi included a sawmill, flour mill, vineyards, orchards, and cattle ranching.

The Lodi Land and Lumber Company sawmill was built on the south bank of the Mokelumne River in 1877, and relied on logs floated down from the Sierras during the rainy season.

The "Flame Tokay" grape was introduced from Algeria in 1857, and was a central feature of the vineyards that gradually rose to prominence because of the sandy loam soil and the location directly east of the Suisun Pass. Local Marvin Nies used old flame tokay vines located on property farmed by Malcolm Lea to create, in conjunction with U.C. Davis plant breeding specialists, the seedless Tokay. Malcolm Lea, a co-founder of Guild Winery and East-Side Winery, sold substantial quantities of crushed grapes to Inglenook and other older Napa wineries as well as selling truckloads of crushed grapes to San Francisco restaurants who made their own "house" wines.  For a brief period during the late 19th century the vines were usurped in favor of watermelons and wheat, but price cuts and labeling problems encouraged farmers to plant more vines.Company.

The early 20th century saw the establishment of several large manufacturers and general service providers with national distribution capabilities, such as Supermold, the Pinkerton Foundry, Lodi Truck Service, the Lodi Iron Works, Pacific Coast Producers, Holz Rubber Company, Valley Industries, General Mills and Goehring Meat Company.

Today the Lodi area is home to several large manufacturing, general services, and agricultural companies, including Archer Daniels Midland, Blue Shield of California, Dart Container, Holz Rubber Company, Kubota Tractors, Lodi Iron Works, Miller Packing Company, Pacific Coast Producers, Tiger Lines, Ag Industrial Manufacturing, Inc. (AIM), and Woodbridge-Robert Mondavi.

Lodi is the birthplace of A&W Root Beer and A&W Restaurants established in 1919, which subsequently became one of the first franchised fast food restaurants.

Top employers
According to the city's 2021 Comprehensive Annual Financial Report, the top employers in the city were:

Arts and culture

A&W Root Beer

Lodi is the birthplace of A&W Root Beer, the first batch of which was made in 1919 on a hot dog cart during a parade. The spot where Roy Allen sold his root beer is now marked with a plaque. It is now sold in cans and bottles throughout the US, as well as in a chain of American restaurants. Lodi's A&W restaurant features a vast collection of A&W novelties.

Farmers market
The Farmers Market is held every Thursday evening from May 18 through September 1 (as of 2016) on School Street in Downtown Lodi. It is hosted and run by the Lodi Chamber of Commerce. It offers a large collection of fresh produce as well as baked goods, crafts, food vendors, and live entertainment.

Grapes and wine
Lodi and its surroundings are well known for the cultivation of grapes and production of wine. There are many vineyards in Lodi with century-old grapevines, some going into California wines like Bedrock and Turley. Starting in the early 20th century, and right up to the early 1980s, Lodi promoted itself as the "Tokay Capital of the World" due to the abundance of the Flame Tokay variety in the area. The town is surrounded by grapevines and the police cars have grape bunches painted on the sides of them. Winegrape culture pervades the town, with many business, street, and school names relating to the industry.

With the replacement by other varietals, primarily Zinfandel, Lodi is recognized for the old vine Zinfandel. Lodi's growth as a premium winegrape producer and awarded wine region is largely due to the formation of the Lodi Winegrape Commission in 1991, five years after the appellation was formed. In 1991, winegrape growers decided to self-impose a tax on their grapes to fund the commission, which now boasts seven full-time staff members and several volunteer committees focused on education, research, and marketing of the region's winegrapes. In 1992, the commission launched a grape Integrated Pest Management Program which has become California's original winegrape sustainability program, known as Lodi Rules. In 2014, the rigorous, third-party certified Lodi Rules Sustainability Program was awarded the Governor's Environmental and Economic Leadership Award. In 2015, Lodi was named Wine Region of the Year by Wine Enthusiast magazine. The Wine Bloggers Conference of 2016 brought over 300 wine bloggers to the area, where attendees filled the Internet with compliments about the small-town hospitality of Lodi's approachable, authentic winegrowing community.

Every September the Lodi Grape Festival is held and includes rides, food, and wine tasting. The Wine & Food Festival (formerly known as the Spring Wine Show, held in late March/early April, so as not to coincide with Easter every year) also showcases the area's 50-plus wineries. Beginning in 2016 there will also be a Beer Fest showcasing IPA and other types of beer along with food and music.

Museums

The Hill House Museum, a restored Queen Anne Victorian built around 1901 for an early, skilled jeweler/watchmaking Lodian, George Hill, contains historical exhibits relating to the history of the town, including the house's original furniture.

The San Joaquin County Historical Society and Museum, the largest museum complex in the county, is just south of Lodi, at the Micke Grove Regional Park, and traces the history of the area through many exhibits and interactive displays.

World of Wonders, a downtown science museum modeled after the San Francisco Exploratorium, features interactive science exhibits, classrooms, and a retail store. The museum first opened on January 4, 2009.

Theater

Changing Faces Theater Company is a non-profit, student-run organization, which is supported by the Lodi Arts Commission.  An annual two-week production occurs each summer and is cast with mostly local children ranging from age six up to college students and, sometimes, a few adults.  The production is normally staged at Jessie's Grove Winery where a number of additional activities are typically held at the same time.

Lodi Musical Theatre Company is also prominent in the Lodi theatre community, staging shows at Hutchins Street Square such as West Side Story and Joseph and the Amazing Technicolor Dreamcoat.

From the 1970s to the late 1990s, Lodi was also home to the "Tokay Players," a group of local actors, directors, set builders etc. who had no professional experience, but put on dozens of productions over the period.

Zinfest

Conceived in 2005 by the Lodi Winegrape Commission, this wine event is held at Lodi Lake and features Lodi's finest Zinfandel wines.  Usually held on the third weekend of May, this event includes a Friday-night dinner called "Vintner's Grille".
As of 2020, Zinfest was renamed to RowXRow, but the 2020 festival was canceled due to the COVID-19 pandemic.

Wine and Chocolate Weekend 
This annual event began in 1997 and is held every February. Wineries of the Lodi Appellation participate with each of the more than 50 wineries hosting special activities. Tickets include two days of wine tasting, a wine glass, a chocolate treat, and a chance to win prizes.

Transportation

The City of Lodi operates the Lodi GrapeLine local bus service.

Lodi Transit Station is served by Amtrak San Joaquin service on the Sacramento branch. It became a regular stop in 2002. The station is also served by Amtrak Thruway Motorcoach, Greyhound Lines, San Joaquin Regional Transit District, and South County Transit.

Media 
 Lodi Monthly Magazine
 Lodi News-Sentinel

In popular culture
A Creedence Clearwater Revival song, "Lodi", was named for Lodi, California, although the songwriter John Fogerty admits he had never actually visited the city and simply thought it was "the coolest sounding name."

The opening scene from the film, Cool Hand Luke, where Paul Newman was cutting the parking meters, was shot in Lodi.

Lodi was featured by Huell Howser in Road Trip Episode 144. Lodi is also often mentioned in the FX show, Sons of Anarchy. The show takes place in the fictional town of "Charming", which is said to neighbor Lodi.

Sister cities

 Kofu, Japan (April 11, 1961)
 Lodi, Italy

Notable people 
A Skylit Drive, post-hardcore band
Jason Bartlett, Major League Baseball player
Greg Bishop, former National Football League player
Olympe Bradna, French actress and dancer, lived and died in Lodi
Sara Carter of the Carter Family retired to Lodi with her second husband, Coy Bayes.
Lisa Breckenridge, former journalist
Bill Cartwright, former National Basketball Association player
Mary Castle, actress
William Chaney, educator
David Cooper, Major League Baseball player
Nathan Diaz, UFC mixed martial artist
Nick Diaz, UFC mixed martial artist
Sione Fua, NFL player
Brandi Hitt, journalist  
Alyson Huber, former Member of the State Assembly
Patrick Ianni, Major League Soccer player
Tayt Ianni, former Major League Soccer player
Bridget Marquardt, model and television personality
Reagan Maui'a, National Football League player
Justin Medeiros, professional CrossFit athlete
Robert Mondavi, vintner and winery owner
Bill Munson, former National Football League player
Barbara Oakley, expert in the field of learning practices
Tesla, rock band
Brad Wellman, former infielder for the San Francisco Giants
Destiny Rogers, R&B singer
Bob Sternfels, Managing Director of McKinsey & Company
Jae Suh Park, actress

See also
California wine

References

External links

 

 
Incorporated cities and towns in California
Cities in San Joaquin County, California
1906 establishments in California
Populated places established in 1906